Myriam Catania (born 12 December 1979) is an Italian actress and voice actress.

Biography
Born in Rome and the daughter of actress and dubber Rossella Izzo, Catania makes frequent acting and dubbing collaborations with members of her family. She began her on-screen career as a child actress on television in 1985 and she made her debut appearance on film in 1999. She appeared in over 16 films and 23 television shows during her career and she also worked as a voice actress. She is the official Italian voice actress of Keira Knightley, Amanda Seyfried and Jessica Alba. Catania is also well known for providing the Italian voices of Anna Paquin, Mary Elizabeth Winstead, Olivia Wilde, Alexis Bledel, Malin Åkerman and more.

Catania’s most popular dubbing contributions include Elizabeth Swann (portrayed by Keira Knightley) in the Pirates of the Caribbean film series and Rogue (portrayed by Anna Paquin) in the X-Men film series (excluding X-Men: The Last Stand). On television, she dubbed Rory Gilmore (portrayed by Alexis Bledel) in Gilmore Girls and Willow Rosenberg (portrayed by Alyson Hannigan in Buffy the Vampire Slayer. In Catania’s animated roles, she voiced Jenny in the Italian version of Oliver & Company. This was among her earliest voice acting contributions.

Personal life
After five years of dating, Catania married actor Luca Argentero in 2009. They divorced in 2016. She is now in a relationship with French publicist Quentin Kammermann and they have a son, Jacques, who was born in 2017.

Filmography

Cinema
Love in the Mirror (1999)
Break Free (2003)
Stregeria (2003)
Io no (2003)
What Will Happen to Us (2004)
Dalla parte giusta (2005)
L'uomo privato (2007)
La bella gente (2009)
Alice (2010)
Tutto l'amore del mondo (2010)
Some Say No (2011)
Il sesso aggiunto (2011)
Ci vediamo a casa (2012)
Canepazzo (2012)
The Veil of Maya (2017)
Lasciami per sempre (2017)
Anche senza di te (2018)

Television
Un ponte per Terabithia (1985)
Pizzaiolo et Mozzarel (1985)
Papà prende moglie (1993)
Caro maestro (1996)
Una donna per amico (1998-1999)
Ciao professore (1999)
Baldini e Simoni (1999)
Non lasciamoci più (2000)
The Wings of Life (2000)
Cuccioli (2002)
Così com'è la vita (2002)
Lo zio d'America (2002-2006)
L'inganno (2003)
Carabinieri (2005)
Provaci ancora prof (2005)
Gente di mare (2005-2007)
Questa è la mia terra (2006-2008)
L'ispettore Coliandro (2010)
È arrivata la felicità (2015)
Amore a prima vista (2019)

Dubbing roles

Animation
Jenny in Oliver & Company
Susan Murphy / Ginormica in Monsters vs. Aliens
Susan Murphy / Ginormica in Monsters vs Aliens: The Series (ep. 1-26)
Anne-Marie in All Dogs Go to Heaven
Nita in Brother Bear 2
Augie Shumway in ALF: The Animated Series

Live action
Elizabeth Swann in Pirates of the Caribbean: The Curse of the Black Pearl
Elizabeth Swann in Pirates of the Caribbean: Dead Man's Chest
Elizabeth Swann in Pirates of the Caribbean: At World's End
Frankie Almond Smith in The Hole
Lara Guishar Antipova in Doctor Zhivago
Guinevere in King Arthur
Jackie Price in The Jacket
Elizabeth Bennet in Pride & Prejudice
Cecilia Tallis in Atonement
Leah in Stories of Lost Souls
Hélène Joncour in Silk
Vera in The Edge of Love
Joanna Reed in Last Night
Charlotte in London Boulevard
Penny Lockhart in Seeking a Friend for the End of the World
Anna Karenina in Anna Karenina
Cathy Muller in Jack Ryan: Shadow Recruit
Gretta James in Begin Again
Megan Birch in Laggies
Joan Clarke in The Imitation Game
Jan Arnold in Everest
Gabrielle Colette in Colette
Rachael Morgan in The Aftermath
Sophie Sheridan in Mamma Mia!
Chloe Sweeney in Chloe
Savannah Lynn Curtis in Dear John
Sylvia Weis in In Time
Cosette in Les Misérables
Linda Lovelace in Lovelace
Louise in A Million Ways to Die in the West
Darby Massey in While We're Young
Samantha Jackson in Ted 2
Ruby in Love the Coopers
Samantha Swoboda in P.U.N.K.S.
Nancy Callahan in Sin City
Nancy Callahan in Sin City: A Dame to Kill For
Sydney Wells in The Eye
Sartana Rivera in Machete
Sartana Rivera in Machete Kills
Andi Garcia in Little Fockers
Joyce Lakeland in The Killer Inside Me
Marissa Wilson in Spy Kids: All the Time in the World
Charlie in Stretch
Victoria Knox in Barely Lethal
Jessica Alba in Entourage
Maggie Price in The Veil
Gina Thornton in Mechanic: Resurrection
Beth Flowers in El Camino Christmas
Maya Graham in Flipper
Max Guevara / X5-452 in Dark Angel
Marie D'Ancanto / Rogue in X-Men
Marie D'Ancanto / Rogue in X2
Marie D'Ancanto / Rogue in X-Men: Days of Future Past
Gwen Grayson / Royal Pain / Sue Tennyson in Sky High
Ramona Flowers in Scott Pilgrim vs. the World
Kate Lloyd in The Thing
Holly Keely in The Spectacular Now
Rowan Blackshaw in The Returned
Rory Gilmore in Gilmore Girls
Willow Rosenberg in Buffy the Vampire Slayer
Ashley Banks in The Fresh Prince of Bel-Air
Marti Perkins in Hellcats
Lila in The Heartbreak Kid
Ronnie in Couples Retreat
Kate Harrison in Trophy Wife
Cady Heron in Mean Girls
Lindsay Lohan in The Holiday
Ella Swenson in Cowboys & Aliens
Suzy Miller in Rush
Zoe McConnell in The Lazarus Effect
Abby Dempsey in Life Itself
Kasumi in DOA: Dead or Alive
Jasmine Trussell in Parenthood
Caroline Enys in Poldark
Kris Furillo in Wildfire
Lena Kaligaris in The Sisterhood of the Traveling Pants 2
Kitty Friedman in Jenny's Wedding
Isabella of Angoulême in Robin Hood
Mel Ames in Twilight
Alex Latourno in 8 Mile
Carly Spencer in Transformers: Dark of the Moon
Rayna Boyanova in Spy
Wendy Hood in The Ice Storm
Bela Talbot in Supernatural
Riley Perrin in Baby Daddy
Lana Tisdel in Boys Don't Cry
Rachel Ashe in Beverly Hills Chihuahua
Dr. Green / Viper in The Wolverine
Ann August in Anywhere But Here
Penny Pinchelow in Dumb and Dumber To
Skyler Cooper in What to Expect When You're Expecting
Samantha Shane in Battleship
Charlotte in About Time

References

External links
 
 
 
 

1979 births
Living people
Actresses from Rome
Italian film actresses
Italian television actresses
Italian voice actresses
Italian stage actresses
Italian radio actresses
Italian child actresses
20th-century Italian actresses
21st-century Italian actresses